Aprominta australis is a moth in the family Autostichidae. It was described by László Anthony Gozmány in 1966. It is found in Guinea.

References

Moths described in 1966
Aprominta
Moths of Africa